Astromicin (INN)(also frequently referenced in scientific journal articles as compounds Fortimicin A/B ) is an aminoglycoside antibiotic. Synthesized from Micromonospora olivasterospora(also named with additional o in olivoasterospora).

References 

Aminoglycoside antibiotics